District 12 may refer to:

District 12 (Ho Chi Minh city), Vietnam
Schwamendingen, Zürich, Switzerland, also known as District 12
 District 12, an electoral district of Malta
District 12 (Hunger Games), fictional district in the Hunger Games books and films
District 12 (boy band)

See also
District 6 (disambiguation)
District 7 (disambiguation)
District 8 (disambiguation)
District 9 (disambiguation)
District 10 (disambiguation)
District 11 (disambiguation)
District 13 (disambiguation)